The 1984 United States Senate election in Delaware was held on November 6, 1984. Incumbent Democratic Senator Joe Biden won re-election to a third term, defeating Republican challenger John M. Burris.

General election

Candidates
 Joe Biden (D), incumbent Delaware Senator running for a third Senatorial term
 John M. Burris (R), businessman and former Minority and later Majority Leader of the Delaware House of Representatives

Results

County results

See also 
  1984 United States Senate elections

External links

Campaign advertisement videos

Biden

Burris

References 

1984
Delaware
1984 Delaware elections
s